Kao Hao-wen (born 17 March 1995 in Hualien City) is a male Chinese Taipei recurve archer. He competed in the archery competition at the 2016 Summer Olympics in Rio de Janeiro.

Kao is a member of the Taroko tribe and hails from Xiulin township. As a child, he watched his elders hunt with bows and arrows, so he became interested in archery.

References

External links
 

Taiwanese male archers
Living people
1995 births
Truku people
People from Hualien County
Archers at the 2016 Summer Olympics
Olympic archers of Taiwan
21st-century Taiwanese people